Meet Me at Dawn is a 1947 British romantic comedy film directed by Peter Creswell and Thornton Freeland and starring William Eythe, Stanley Holloway and Hazel Court. The screenplay concerns a very skilled pistol shot who hires himself out to fight and duels in early twentieth century Paris.

Cast
 William Eythe as Charles Morton
 Stanley Holloway as Emile Pollet
 Hazel Court as Gabrielle Vermorel
 George Thorpe as Senator Philipe Renault
 Irene Browne as  Mme. Renault
 Beatrice Campbell  as  Margot
 Basil Sydney as Georges Vermorel
 Margaret Rutherford as  Madame Vernorel
 Ada Reeve as Mathilde - the Concierge
 Graeme Muir  as Count de Brissac
 Wilfrid Hyde-White as Garin - News Editor
 John Ruddock  as  Doctor
 O. B. Clarence as Ambassador
 Aubrey Mallalieu  as  Prefect of Police
 James Harcourt  as Henri - the Butler
 Charles Victor as 1st Client
 John Salew as 2nd Client
 Percy Walsh as Shooting Gallery Man
 Hy Hazell as 1st Girl in Restaurant
 Joan Seton as Vermorel's Secretary
 Katie Johnson as Henriette - Mme. Vermorel's Housekeeper
 Diana Decker as 2nd Girl in Restaurant
 Lind Joyce as Yvonne Jadin - Singer
 Guy Rolfe as Ambassador's Friend (uncredited)
 Charles Hawtrey as Reporter at the fair (uncredited)
 Anthony Dawson as First Duelling Opponent (uncredited)

Critical reception
The New York Times wrote that the film is something less than choice either as comedy or romance. In truth, it is plain boring, and the fault isn't Mr. Eythe's. He is pleasant enough in all that he has to do, but the central line of the story...is spread pretty thin...The handful who were present at the first showing yesterday afternoon took "Meet Me at Dawn" without any trace of amusement.

References

External links

1947 films
1940s historical romance films
British historical comedy films
1947 romantic comedy films
British romantic comedy films
Films directed by Thornton Freeland
British black-and-white films
Films set in Paris
Films set in the 1900s
20th Century Fox films
1940s historical comedy films
British historical romance films
1940s English-language films
1940s British films